Boom! is an American television game show that premiered on the Fox network on June 25, 2015. An adaptation of an Israeli series with the same title, Boom! is a general-knowledge quiz show where three players must correctly answer questions in order to defuse bombs. The program's stage utilizes 3D projection mapping featuring more than one million LEDs. Boom! is produced by Jeff Apploff and Bob Boden.

On August 21, 2016, FOX cancelled Boom! after one season due to low ratings.

Format

Main game
Three players compete as a team to defuse a series of six time bombs by answering one question per bomb. Each question has several answer choices, only one of which is incorrect, and each answer corresponds to a differently colored wire on the bomb. The goal is to cut the wires for only the correct answers before the timer on the bomb reaches zero.

Before each question, the category is given and the team chooses one player to attempt it. When the player cuts a wire, the timer briefly stops and the result is revealed after a three-second delay. If the player cuts all the correct wires, the bomb is defused and money is added to the team's bank. However, if the player cuts the incorrect wire or if time runs out, the bomb "explodes", spraying its contents all over him/her and the studio. That player is then eliminated from the game, and no money is added to the bank.

The players and host all wear safety goggles for eye protection while onstage, and the audience members in the front rows wear goggles and plastic rain ponchos to keep themselves clean. The contents of the bombs are typically food items that are sticky and/or hard to clean off clothing, such as pizza sauce, maple syrup, and gravy.

Every player must attempt to defuse at least one of the six bombs. If all three players are eliminated, the game ends and the team leaves with no winnings. Values, time limits, and numbers of answer choices increase from one question to the next as shown below.

Mega Money Bomb
If at least one player is still in the game after the sixth bomb, the team must decide whether to take their winnings and end the game, or attempt to answer a seventh question and defuse the final Mega Money Bomb. The host gives them the category for this question in order to help them decide.

The question has 10 answer choices, seven correct and three incorrect, and a 90-second time limit. One player cuts the wires, while the other two can offer advice, and all three must stand over the bomb. Any player may be chosen to cut the wires, regardless of whether or not he/she was eliminated from the main game. If the players successfully defuse the bomb, their entire bank is quadrupled; if not, it is cut in half.

The maximum possible winnings total is $500,000, obtained by successfully defusing all seven bombs.

Episodes

International versions 
In some international versions, there are two teams of four, and the player must avoid cutting the color wire corresponding to the correct answer.

Legend:
 Currently airing  
 No longer airing  
 Upcoming or returning version

References

External links 
 Official Site on Fox
 Info about the show

2010s American comedy game shows
2015 American television series debuts
2015 American television series endings
Fox Broadcasting Company original programming
Quiz shows
American television series based on Israeli television series
Television series by Dick Clark Productions